Basin is a town in, and the county seat of, Big Horn County, Wyoming, United States. The population was 1,225 at the 2020 census. The community is located near the center of the Bighorn Basin with the Big Horn River east of the town.  Basin's post office, built in 1919, is listed on the National Register of Historic Places.

Geography
Basin is located at  (44.378777, -108.043100).

Basin is known as The Lilac City. Basin hosts the Big Horn County Fair each summer.

Climate
Basin has a cold desert climate (Köppen climate classification BWk).
The town had the highest temperature ever recorded in Wyoming, on August 8, 1983, and also holds the state record high temperatures for April ( in 1948) and July ( in 1900).

In general, the eastern portion of the Bighorn Basin is hotter than the rest of Wyoming during the summer months. Due to frequent low humidity, daily temperature ranges are large, whilst due to the very dry conditions snowfall is among the lightest in the northern Rockies and Plains region – it is not uncommon for no measurable precipitation to fall in a month between September and April.

Demographics

2010 census
As of the census of 2010, there were 1,285 people, 520 households, and 333 families residing in the town. The racial makeup of the town was 94.2% White, 0.5% African American, 1.9% Native American, 0.5% Asian, 1.6% from other races, and 1.3% from two or more races. Hispanic or Latino of any race were 5.4% of the population.

There were 520 households, of which 25.0% had children under the age of 18 living with them, 51.9% were married couples living together, 8.3% had a female householder with no husband present, 3.8% had a male householder with no wife present, and 36.0% were non-families. 31.5% of all households were made up of individuals, and 15.8% had someone living alone who was 65 years of age or older. The average household size was 2.27 and the average family size was 2.83.

The median age in the town was 46.4 years. 20.1% of residents were under the age of 18; 6.7% were between the ages of 18 and 24; 21.5% were from 25 to 44; 27.2% were from 45 to 64; and 24.4% were 65 years of age or older. The gender makeup of the town was 50.0% male and 50.0% female.

2000 census
As of the census of 2000, there were 1,238 people, 504 households, and 330 families residing in the town. The population density was 613.7 people per square mile (236.6/km2). There were 565 housing units at an average density of 280.1 per square mile (108.0/km2). The racial makeup of the town was 96.77% White, 0.08% African American, 1.05% Native American, 0.24% Asian, 0.97% from other races, and 0.89% from two or more races. Hispanic or Latino of any race were 2.26% of the population.

There were 504 households, out of which 22.2% had children under the age of 18 living with them, 56.3% were married couples living together, 6.3% had a female householder with no husband present, and 34.5% were non-families. 31.3% of all households were made up of individuals, and 16.5% had someone living alone who was 65 years of age or older. The average household size was 2.20 and the average family size was 2.74.

In the town, the population was spread out, with 20.1% under the age of 18, 5.5% from 18 to 24, 19.6% from 25 to 44, 27.9% from 45 to 64, and 26.9% who were 65 years of age or older. The median age was 48 years. For every 100 females, there were 90.8 males. For every 100 females age 18 and over, there were 86.6 males.

The median income for a household in the town was $33,519, and the median income for a family was $42,768. Males had a median income of $33,942 versus $20,139 for females. The per capita income for the town was $17,890. About 6.1% of families and 11.6% of the population were below the poverty line, including 17.5% of those under age 18 and 12.7% of those age 65 or over.

Government and infrastructure
The Wyoming Department of Health Wyoming Retirement Center, a nursing home, is located in Basin. The facility was operated by the Wyoming Board of Charities and Reform until that agency was dissolved as a result of a state constitutional amendment passed in November 1990.

The United States Postal Service operates the Basin Post Office.

Education
Public education in the town of Basin is provided by Big Horn County School District #4. The district has 3 schools across a single campus – Laura Irwin Elementary School (grades K-5), Riverside Middle School (grades 6–8), and Riverside High School (grades 9–12). The middle school and high school both operate under one building, which is adjacent to the elementary school building.

Basin has a public library, a branch of the Big Horn County Library System.

See also
Basin Republican-Rustler Printing Building
List of municipalities in Wyoming

References

External links

 Town of Basin
 Basin Republican Rustler

Towns in Big Horn County, Wyoming
Towns in Wyoming
County seats in Wyoming